Ele, My Friend is a 1992 English-language children's film directed by Dharan Mandrayar and produced by Linda Mandrayar. The film stars Jacob Paul Guzman and an elephant named Ganesh. The film, an Indo-British co-production, revolves around a bond between 10-year old Charles and an elephant, which he names Ele.

Cast 
Jacob Paul Guzman as Charles
Ganesh as Ele
Gazan Khan as Jaggu
R. S. Shivaji as Ahmed
Katherine Byers as Mary
Santhana Bharathi as Kallar Village Chief
Amjad Khan as Omar (special appearance)
Prabhu (special appearance)

Production 
Dharan Mandrayar, a nephew of actor Sivaji Ganesan, studied in India and later in the United States. He forayed into films after being encouraged by his wife, Linda. The film was shot in South India and was produced by Dharan and Linda Mandrayar's Dharlin Entertainment. Filming began on 3 February 1992.

Release 
The film was released in Germany and Italy as Mein Freund, der kleine Elefant and Il Mio Amico Elé, respectively. The film was made available on DVD in 2008.

Reception 
A critic from Movie Guide opined that "Ele, My Friend is a rare, gentle movie that will satisfy the viewer". Regarding the German version, a critic from Kinder Film Welt criticised several aspects of the film including the acting, music, and sound.

Accolades 
The film won the Best Picture for Environment and Quality of Life Award in Bellinzona, Switzerland.

References

External links 

English-language Indian films